Clarence John Ostalkiewicz Jr. (19 September 1952 – 25 May 2010) was an American politician.

Ostalkiewicz was born in Massachusetts on 19 September 1952 to a textiles executive and raised in Rhode Island. He earned a bachelor's degree in business administration at Babson College, specializing in accounting, economics and finance. Ostalkiewicz pursued graduate-level study at several educational institutions, but never completed a master's degree. He moved to Windermere, Florida, in 1988, and founded a business that imported diamonds. Ostalkiewicz served in the Florida Senate as a Republican from 1994 to 1998, defeating incumbent officeholder Gary Siegel. Ostalkiewicz left the state senate to run for Mayor of Orange County, Florida, losing to Mel Martínez, and thereafter retired from politics. In later life, Ostalkiewicz was diagnosed with kidney cancer. While seeking treatment for the disease in South Korea, he died on 25 May 2010, aged 57.

References

1952 births
2010 deaths
20th-century American politicians
20th-century American businesspeople
Babson College alumni
Businesspeople from Florida
Diamond dealers
Republican Party Florida state senators
Deaths from kidney cancer
Deaths from cancer in South Korea
People from Windermere, Florida